Brahim Izdag (born 2 May 1966) is a Moroccan alpine skier. He competed in two events at the 1992 Winter Olympics.

References

1966 births
Living people
Moroccan male alpine skiers
Olympic alpine skiers of Morocco
Alpine skiers at the 1992 Winter Olympics
Place of birth missing (living people)
20th-century Moroccan people